Aiouea dubia is a species of tree in the family Lauraceae. It is native to South America.

References 

Trees of Peru
dubia